Stirling railway station is a railway station located in Stirling, Scotland. It is located on the former Caledonian Railway main line between Glasgow and Perth.

History 

Stirling was first connected to the Scottish Central Railway in 1848. Lines were subsequently opened by the Stirling and Dunfermline Railway in 1853, and by the Forth and Clyde Junction Railway to  three years later.  Through services to/from the Callander and Oban Railway also served the station from 1870.
 
Following a competition, the current station buildings were constructed by Caledonian Railway in 1912-15 by James Miller and William A. Paterson, at a cost of £36.291. They have undergone several refurbishments (with minor layout changes), the most recent change being the installation of lifts to enable better access to the footbridge linking Platform 2 with Platforms 3 to 8.  

The line to Balloch lost its passenger services in 1934 and closed as a through route in 1942, although the section from Stirling to Port of Menteith remained open for freight until 1959. The main line from Stirling to Dunfermline was not scheduled for closure under the Beeching Axe, but it was nevertheless closed in 1968. It has since been partly reopened as far as Alloa (see below).

A Motorail service ran between London and Stirling until 1989.

In 2008, the travel centre was refurbished to improve disabled access, including power-assisted entrance doors, a wheelchair-accessible counter, and improved customer information systems. In 2009, a shelter was erected on Platforms 9 and 10, and LED display boards replaced the CRT screens, including new displays for Platforms 9 and 10 and the bay Platforms 7 and 8. (Up to c.1988, a large flip-dot display was located above the main concourse; this was removed and the space filled in with a large "Welcome to Stirling Station" sign.) From December 2009, automated announcements were provided, replacing the manual announcements made from the supervisor's office on Platform 3. In 2013, a new public address system was installed. In 2018, work began to refurbish the footbridge. It was raised to allow the tracks underneath to be electrified, and lifts installed to allow step-free access to platform 9. The refurbished bridge was opened on 9 September 2019.

Stationmasters

Thomas Freer Ash ca. 1851 ca. 1864
Mr Irons 1868 - 1871
John Samuel 1871 - 1899 (formerly station master at Carstairs)
James G. Samuel 1899 - 1907 (son of the former station master)
William Salmond 1907 - 1912 (formerly station master at Forfar, afterwards station master at Dundee)
James J. Brown 1912 - 1924 (formerly station master at Blairgowrie)
William McWhirter 1924 - 1933 (formerly station master at Paisley)
William Shaw 1934 - 1941 (formerly station master at Jedburgh)
David Valentine 1941 - 1948 (formerly station master at Stranraer)
George Milne 1948 - 1956
Robert Duncan from 1956

Description 

The station building was constructed in 1915 by James Miller, replacing the original 1848 structure designed by Andrew Heiton, and is listed by Historic Environment Scotland as a Category A listed building. Miller's design continues the circular spaces and flowing curves of his celebrated Wemyss Bay station.

The station houses a Neighbourhood Policing Team (NPT) from the British Transport Police.

The Stirling Area Command of the Forth Valley Division of Police Scotland cover the territorial area the Stirling NPT cover and will assist when the BTP officers are not available.

Services 

This utilises the existing DMU from Glasgow, which previously spent considerable time in one of the bay platforms at Stirling with engines idling, but now utilises the layover time to make the return trip to & from Alloa.

Most services are operated by ScotRail; with two trains per day southbound to London Kings Cross and one train per day northbound to Inverness operated by London North Eastern Railway (a second northbound service terminates at Stirling); and one train per day Sunday – Friday southbound to London Euston and northbound to Inverness operated by Caledonian Sleeper.  The station has nine platforms, though they are ordered 2 to 10. The site of Platform 1 is now occupied by a car park; the platforms were not renumbered. The bay platforms at the north end of the station (Platforms 4 and 5) survive but are not available to passenger trains. The bay platforms at the south end of the station (Platforms 7 and 8) are not normally used for weekday services, but the first services of the day use trains that have been stabled there overnight and they have been fitted with passenger information displays.

A major Scottish area timetable recast in 2018 backed by Transport Scotland will see improved journey times from Stirling to both Edinburgh and Glasgow and more frequent services to Gleneagles, Dundee, Perth and Inverness.  The lines from Glasgow to Alloa and from Polmont to Dunblane are also due to be resignalled and electrified by 2018 as part of the rolling  modernisation work associated with the Edinburgh to Glasgow Improvement Programme.

Summary 
3tph to Glasgow Queen Street
1tph to Edinburgh Waverley
1tph to Alloa
1tph to Dunblane
2tpd to Kings Cross

References

External links

Railscot - Photographs of Stirling
Video footage of Stirling station.

Railway stations in Stirling (council area)
Former Caledonian Railway stations
Railway stations in Great Britain opened in 1848
Railway stations served by ScotRail
Railway stations served by Caledonian Sleeper
Railway stations served by London North Eastern Railway
Category A listed buildings in Stirling (council area)
Listed railway stations in Scotland
James Miller railway stations
Buildings and structures in Stirling (city)